The Tiraspol uezd was one of the subdivisions of the Kherson Governorate of the Russian Empire. It was situated in the southwestern part of the governorate. Its administrative centre was Tiraspol.

Demographics
At the time of the Russian Empire Census of 1897, Tiraspolsky Uyezd had a population of 240,145. Of these, 33.3% spoke Ukrainian, 24.9% Romanian, 16.9% Russian, 9.9% Yiddish, 9.8% German, 3.7% Bulgarian, 0.8% Polish, 0.2% Armenian, 0.1% Belarusian, 0.1% Romani and 0.1% Tatar as their native language.

References

 
Uezds of Kherson Governorate
Kherson Governorate